Gestad SK is a Swedish football club located in Gestad

Football
Men
In 2008 Gestad SK was withdrawn from Swedish league after winning Division 6 Dalsland. Men's team was terminated

Women
Gestad SK, Brålanda IF och Åsebro IF has together women's team named Åsebro/Brålanda, which is playing in Swedish Women's Football Division 2 Bohuslän/Dalsland.

External links
Official site 

Football clubs in Västra Götaland County
1969 establishments in Sweden
Association football clubs established in 1969